The Voice van Vlaanderen is a Belgian reality talent show. The second season of the Flemish version premiered on January 18, 2013 on the vtm television network.

The coaches for this season were Natalia Druyts, one of the most popular recording artists of Flanders and close runner-up of the first season of Idool; Koen Wauters, host and judge of several casting shows and band member of Clouseau; Jasper Steverlinck, who was topping the Flemish single charts with a cover of "Life on Mars"; and Alex Callier from Flemish band Hooverphonic.

The winner of the second season was Paulien Mathues. Because she belonged to Jasper Steverlink's team, Steverlink became the winning coach of The Voice for the second time.

Contestants
Contestants for the live shows were:

Team Alex
Olivier De Laet
Jaouad Alloul
Jelle Degens
Kaat Verschueren
Toni Verlinden
Arnd Van Vlierden
Lauren Zweegers
Kaat Verschueren
Timna Vanhecke

Team Koen
Theo Dewitte
Maria Theresa Morales
Eva Van Puyvelde
Niels Cockx
Els Artois
Patricia Lalomia
Freija D'Hondt
Jeroen Van Troyen

Team Jasper
Paulien Mathues
Matthijs Vanstaen
Domien Cnockaert
Sarah Godard
Lisa Castelli
Lori Eestermans
Eva & Elias Storme
Bert Van Renne

Team Natalia
Robby Longo
Jana De Valck
Daniel López Montejo
Chris Medaer
Julie Barbé
Jens Oomes
Lucas Peeters
Bjorn & Joeri Rotthier

Blind auditions

Episode 1 (18 January 2013)

Episode 2 (25 January 2013)

Episode 3 (1 February 2013)

Episode 4 (8 February 2013)

Episode 5 (15 February 2013)

Episode 6 (22 February 2013)

Battles
Coaches begin narrowing down the playing field by training the contestants with the help of "trusted advisors". Each episode featured eight battles consisting two of pairings from within each team, and each battle concluding with the respective coach eliminating one of the two contestants; the six winners for each coach advanced to the live shows.

Coaches and assistant coaches

 — Battle winner
 — Stolen by Alex
 — Stolen by Jasper
 — Stolen by Koen
 — Stolen by Natalia

Episode 7 (1 March 2013)

Episode 8 (8 March 2013)

Episode 9 (15 March 2013)

Episode 10 (22 March 2013)

Live shows

 – Winner
 – Kaat Verschueren quit after voice problems and was replaced by Lauren Zweegers

Episode 11 (29 March 2013)

Episode 12 (5 April)

Épisode 13 (12 avril)

Épisode 14 (19 April 2013)

Episode 15 — Semi-final (26 April 2013)

Result

Episode 16 — Final (3 May 2013)

Result

Summaries

Results table

References

2
2013 Belgian television seasons